The fourth round of the women's individual pursuit of the 2009–2010 UCI Track Cycling World Cup Classics took place in Beijing, China on 22 January 2010. 17 athletes participated in the contest

Competition format
The women's individual pursuit consists of a 3 km time trial race between two riders, starting on opposite sides of the track.  If one rider catches the other, the race is over.

The tournament consisted of an initial qualifying round.  The top two riders in the qualifying round advanced to the gold medal match and the third and fourth riders advanced to the bronze medal race.

Schedule
Friday 22 January
12:05-13:05 Qualifying
18:40-18:55 Finals
19:50:-19:55 Victory Ceremony

Schedule from Tissottiming.com

Results

Qualifying

Results from Tissottiming.com.

Finals

Final bronze medal race

Final gold medal race

Results from Tissottiming.com.

World Cup Standings
Final standings after 4 of 4 2009–2010 World Cup races.

Results from Tissottiming.com.

References

2010 in Chinese sport
UCI Track Cycling World Cup – Women's individual pursuit
2009–10 UCI Track Cycling World Cup Classics